The Science and Encyclopaedia Publishing Centre (previously: Science and Encyclopaedia Publishing Institute,  or MELC) is a Lithuanian publishing house that specializes in encyclopedias, reference works, and dictionaries. The Institute, headquartered in Vilnius, is supported by the Lithuanian Republic's Ministry of Education and Science.

The publishing house was established in 1997, as a reorganisation of Science and Encyclopaedia Publishers. The latter publishing house was founded in 1992 after the merger of Mokslas Publishing with the State Encyclopaedia Publishers.

Its major project is the preparation and publication of the 25-volume Visuotinė lietuvių enciklopedija which was completed in 2015. It also publishes several specialized encyclopedias, standard and specialized dictionaries, reference books, research monographs focusing on social science, natural science, and technology, scientific works by international authors, and popular science books.

Major publications
 Visuotinė lietuvių enciklopedija (Universal Lithuanian Encyclopedia)
 Mažosios Lietuvos enciklopedija (Encyclopaedia of Lithuania Minor) (4 vols.)
 Muzikos enciklopedija (Encyclopaedia of Music) (3 vols.)
 Technikos enciklopedija (Technical Encyclopaedia) (4 vols.)
 Žemės ūkio enciklopedija (Encyclopaedia of Agriculture) (3 vols.)
 Baltų religijos ir mitologijos šaltiniai (Sources for the Baltic Religions and Mythology) (4 vols.)
 Lietuvių vardų kilmės žodynas (Etymological Dictionary of Lithuanian Names)
 Senoji Europa (Old Europe) by Marija Gimbutas
 Vokiečių – lietuvių kalbų žodynas (German-Lithuanian Dictionary)
 Rusų – lietuvių kalbų žodynas (Russian-Lithuanian Dictionary)
 The History of the Lithuanian language by Zigmas Zinkevičius

References

External links
 Official website 

Book publishing companies of Lithuania
1997 establishments in Lithuania
Organizations based in Vilnius
20th-century encyclopedias
21st-century encyclopedias
Publishing companies established in 1997